The Dr. S. P. Mukherjee Swimming Stadium  or SPM Swimming Pool Complex is a swimming complex in New Delhi, India, that is hosting the aquatics events for the 2010 Commonwealth Games. The stadium is owned by the Sports Authority of India (SAI). 
It was renovated at a cost of Rs 377 crore (U$84.89 million).

Facilities 
 One competition pool
 One diving pool
 One warm-up pool
 Skating Rink
 Billiards table
 Snooker
 Volley Ball Court

See also 
2010 Commonwealth Games

References

2010 Commonwealth Games venues
Commonwealth Games swimming venues
Swimming venues in India
Sports venues in Delhi
Sports venues completed in 2010
2010 establishments in Delhi
Asian Games water polo venues